Tom Alain Boon (born 25 January 1990) is a Belgian field hockey player who plays as a forward for Léopold and the Belgium national team.

He won a silver medal at the 2016 Olympics.

Club career
He started at Royal White Star HC, and after also having played for Bloemendaal, he played four years for the Belgian team Racing Club de Bruxelles. In 2019, he moved to the 2018–19 Belgian national champions, Léopold, where he signed a contract for five seasons.

International career
Boon made his debut in the national team in 2008. In 2009 he finished fifth with this team at the European Championship in Amstelveen and in 2011 they finished fourth at the European Championship in Mönchengladbach. In 2011, he also won the Champions Challenge. With his club Racing Brussels, he became Belgian field hockey champion for five consecutive years (2009-2013). At the 2012 Summer Olympics, he competed for the national team in the men's tournament that came fifth. Boon became European silver medalist with Belgium at the 2013 European Championship on home ground in Boom. In spite of his opening goal against Germany, Belgium lost the final by 1-3.

At the 2016 Olympics, he was part of the Belgium team that on the silver medal. Boon himself scored a goal in the quarter-final. At the 2019 EuroHockey Championship, where Belgium won its first European title, he was the top goalscorer together with three other players with five goals. On 25 May 2021, he was selected in the squad for the 2021 EuroHockey Championship.

Personal life
Tom Boon was born in a hockey family. His grandmother Jacqueline Ronsmans was a Belgian international player, just like his mother Carine Boon-Coudron and his uncles Eric and Marc Coudron (Belgian record international with 358 games). His sister Jill Boon has also played Olympic hockey for Belgium.

References

External links
 
 
 
 

1990 births
Living people
Field hockey players from Brussels
Belgian male field hockey players
Male field hockey forwards
Field hockey players at the 2012 Summer Olympics
2014 Men's Hockey World Cup players
Field hockey players at the 2016 Summer Olympics
Field hockey players at the 2020 Summer Olympics
2018 Men's Hockey World Cup players
Olympic field hockey players of Belgium
Olympic silver medalists for Belgium
Olympic medalists in field hockey
Medalists at the 2016 Summer Olympics
HC Bloemendaal players
Men's Hoofdklasse Hockey players
Expatriate field hockey players
Belgian expatriate sportspeople in the Netherlands
Men's Belgian Hockey League players
Royal Racing Club Bruxelles players
Royal Léopold Club players
Olympic gold medalists for Belgium
Medalists at the 2020 Summer Olympics
2023 Men's FIH Hockey World Cup players

2018 FIH Indoor Hockey World Cup players